Tahier is a hamlet of the village of Évelette, Wallonia located in the municipality of Ohey, province of Namur, Belgium.

The village contains a chapel dedicated to Saint Servais from the 11th century, restored in the 18th century. There is also a fortified farm complex from the first half of the 17th century in the village.

References

External links

Populated places in Namur (province)